David Shafer Sprague (August 11, 1910 – February 20, 1968) was a star football player in  the Canadian Football League for eleven seasons for the Hamilton Tigers and the Ottawa Rough Riders. He was inducted into the Canadian Football Hall of Fame in 1963 and into the Canada's Sports Hall of Fame in 1975.

Sprague represented Elmdale Ward for one year on Ottawa City Council in 1940.  In the 1940 election he ran for a seat on the Ottawa Board of Control, but lost.

References

 Canada's Sports Hall of Fame profile

External links

1910 births
1968 deaths
People from Dunkirk, New York
American emigrants to Canada
Players of Canadian football from Ontario
Hamilton Tigers football players
Ottawa Rough Riders players
Canadian Football Hall of Fame inductees
Ottawa city councillors
Canadian sportsperson-politicians